Tomas Ramelis (born 28 May 1971) is a retired Lithuanian international football forward. He obtained a total number of fifteen caps for the Lithuania national football team, scoring five goals. During his professional career he played in his native country, Belgium, Germany and Poland.

Honours
 Baltic Cup
 1991
 1997

References
 

1971 births
Living people
Lithuanian footballers
Lithuania international footballers
Association football forwards
FK Panerys Vilnius players
Lithuanian expatriate footballers
Expatriate footballers in Belgium
Expatriate footballers in Germany
Expatriate footballers in Poland
OKS Stomil Olsztyn players
Lithuanian expatriate sportspeople in Poland